Kirill Alexandrovich Dmitriev (born 12 April 1975) is the CEO of the Russian Direct Investment Fund (RDIF), a $10 billion sovereign wealth fund created by the Russian government to co-invest in the Russian economy. His wife Natalia Popova, a deputy director of the NGO Innopraktika Foundation, works for and is a very close friend of Putin's younger daughter Katerina Tikhonova. In February 2022, both Kirill Dmitriev and RDIF were sanctioned by the United States Treasury, following the Russian invasion of Ukraine. Under Mr. Dmitriev's leadership RDIF claims to be the first state owned Russian company to call for diplomatic solution and peace in Ukraine.

Early life 
Kirill Dmitriev was born in 1975 in Kyiv, Ukrainian SSR, Soviet Union. Kirill Dmitriev was one of the first Russian exchange students from Ukraine who came to a host family in New Hampshire in 1990.  When Dmitriev was 14, he was sent to live with friends of his parents in California, where the host family and Dmitriev convinced administrators at Foothill College to enroll him. In two years, he transferred to Stanford University, from which he holds a BA in economics with honors and distinction. He continued his education at Harvard Business School, where he completed the MBA program as a Baker scholar.

Career
Dmitriev worked as an investment banker at Goldman Sachs in New York and a consultant at McKinsey & Company in Los Angeles, Moscow, and Prague, before returning to Russia in 2000. He was an associate at private equity fund Delta Private Equity Partners from 2002 to 2007, while also working for The U.S. Russia Investment Fund. He served as the President of Icon Private Equity from 2007 to 2010.

During his career, Dmitriev worked on the sale of DeltaBank to General Electric, DeltaCredit Bank to Société Générale, CTC Media shares to Fidelity Investments, National Cable Networks to Basic Element, CompuLink to three investment funds, TV3 to Prof-Media, and NTC to Bank Rossiya.

Russian Direct Investment Fund
In 2011 he was appointed as CEO of a newly created Russian Direct Investment Fund (RDIF), a sovereign wealth fund to make equity co-investments in Russia companies. His mission has been described as "to change the face of Russian capitalism" and make the Russian economy less dependent on the petroleum industry by "overcoming western funds’ reluctance to invest in a country many viewed as corrupt, prone to state meddling and plagued by a law-of-the-jungle legal system".

Under his leadership, RDIF has successfully invested with foreign partners in more than 90 projects totaling more than 2.1 trillion rubles and covering 95% of the regions of the Russian Federation. RDIF has established joint strategic partnerships with leading international co-investors from more than 15 countries including Saudi Arabia, UAE, China, Qatar, Kuwait, Bahrain, South Korea, Japan, Vietnam, Italy, France. Foreign partners have included BlackRock, One Equity Partners, Goldman Sachs, and Deutsche Bank.

Fighting COVID-19 
In 2020 Kirill Dmitriev focused RDIF on combatting the novel coronavirus infection through investing in most promising solutions in testing, drugs, vaccines:

 In March, 2020 RDIF invested in the production of unique Russian-Japanese testing system to detect COVID-19 within 30 mins (produced under EMG brand). More than 13 million testing kits were sold by RDIF and its partners abroad. The system is being used in all major airports of Moscow: Sheremetyevo, Domodedovo and Vnukovo.
 In March, 2020 RDIF and Russian pharmaceutical company ChemRar Group agreed to create a JV aimed at the production of Favipiravir-based drug Avifavir (generic version of the Japanese drug Avigan, which was proven to be effective by the Phase 3 clinical trials of Fujifilm Toyama Chemical 5 months after RDIF and ChemRar registered Avifavir in Russia. Avifavir was the first anti-COVID-19 drug officially registered in Russia. It has been exported to more than 15 countries worldwide.
 RDIF invested in the production in Russia and abroad of the Sputnik V vaccine, which became the first registered anti-COVID-19 vaccine in the world. The vaccine is based on the proven and safe platform of human adenoviral vectors.

Dmitriev has been critical of the British COVID-19 vaccine research efforts, repeatedly referring to the Oxford-AstraZeneca vaccine as the "monkey vaccine", as the studies involved a modified version of the virus that infected chimpanzees. Dmitriev stopped this after The Times accused him of acting as part of a co-ordinated disinformation campaign against the British research efforts.

Later on, Dmitriev advocated for the partnership of Gamaleya Institute, RDIF and AstraZeneca to help AstraZeneca increase the efficacy of its vaccine by combining it with one of the components of Sputnik V: on November 23, 2020, RDIF and Gamaleya Institute offered AstraZeneca to collaborate on this via a twitter post. AstraZeneca accepted RDIF's proposal. The partnership between RDIF, Gamaleya Institute and AstraZeneca was created in December 2020. In February 2021, health officials in Azerbaijan granted approval for a clinical trial in the country on combining Russia's Sputnik V vaccine with the Oxford-AstraZeneca COVID-19 shot in adults 18 years and older.

Other activities
The World Economic Forum selected Dmitriev to be a Young Global Leader, and he was elected as a Vice President of the Russian Union of Industrialists and Entrepreneurs (RSPP). In 2011 he was the only Russian national to be named one of 100 most influential private equity professionals of the decade by Private Equity International magazine.

Kirill Dmitriev was Chairman of the B20s Investments and Infrastructure Taskforce during the year of the Russian presidency in G20. In November 2012 he was appointed Deputy Chairman of the Investment Council under the Chairman of the State Duma. Serves as the Russian representative in the APEC Business Advisory Council and in the BRICS Business Council.

He serves on the Board of Directors of Rostelecom, MDMG, Gazprombank, the Russian Railways, Transneft, Rosseti, Skolkovo Foundation, and the supervisory board of ALROSA. He is also on the boards of trustees of the Mariinsky Theatre, Lomonosov Moscow State University, Russian Institute of Theatre Arts GITIS and National History Fund. He was Chairman of the Russian Venture Capital and Private Equity Association from 2005 to 2006.

In January 2017, Dmitriev met with Erik Prince, the founder of the private military company Blackwater, George Nader and the UAE Crown Prince Mohammed bin Zayed Al Nahyan (known as "MBZ") in the Seychelles. The meeting was convened by the UAE. Prince was understood by the other participants to represent the presidential transition team of Donald Trump, while Dmitriev was understood to represent the Russian government. Prior to the meeting Nader had briefed Prince on Dmitriev and at the meeting Nader introduced Prince to Dmitriev as the person "designated by Steve [Bannon] to meet you! I know him and he is very very well connected and trusted by the New Team."

In February 2019, Kirill Dmitriev was one of the first Russian executives and businessmen to personally speak in defence of the detained founder and head of the Baring Vostok Capital Partners Michael Calvey and other detained employees of the investment fund. Dmitriev appealed to Moscow City Court, Moscow's Basmanny district court, and the Russian Investigative Committee, requesting to put detained Michael Calvey and other Baring Vostok employees to house arrest. Later on a court in Moscow released Calvey from pretrial detention and put him to house arrest.

In November 2008, Dmitriev published an essay entitled, "Crisis: five rules for survival", in the leading Russian business daily Vedomosti, the sister paper of the Financial Times and the Wall Street Journal, in which he warned that the financial crisis of 2007–08 crisis would be prolonged.

Awards 
He has been awarded the Order of Alexander Nevsky (12 June 2017), the Order of Honour (16 April 2020) by the Russian Federation. 

He was awarded the Chevalier of the National Order of the Legion of Honour (19 November 2018) for his great contribution to strengthening cooperation between Russia and France, the King Abdulaziz Second-Class Order of Merit (5 October 2019) for his contribution to strengthening cooperation between the Russian Federation and Saudi Arabia, the Commander of the Order of the Star of Italy (14 May 2020) for his special achievements in the development of friendly relations and cooperation between Italy and Russia, and the Order of Friendship of Kazakhstan (20 December 2020) for special merits in the development of friendly relations and cooperation between Kazakhstan and Russia.

Personal life
Dmitriev is married to Natalia Valerievna Popova. Popova is a deputy on the board of the NGO Innopraktika Foundation. Her close friend, Katerina Tikhonova, is the director of the Innopraktika Fund which was created “for an effective and flexible solution to the problems of the country's innovative development”.

The couples Shamalov-Tikhonova and Dmitriev-Popova were very close and went on holiday trips together before the divorce of Shamalov and Tikhonova which was announced in early 2018.

Notes

References

External links

Russian Direct Investment Fund (RDIF)
Icon Private Equity
Delta Private Equity Partners

Press comments
The Banker:Banks merge to combat crisis
BusinessNewEurope

Living people
1975 births
Businesspeople from Kyiv
Stanford University alumni
Harvard Business School alumni
Goldman Sachs people
Private equity and venture capital investors
Russians associated with interference in the 2016 United States elections
Russian individuals subject to the U.S. Department of the Treasury sanctions
Russian individuals subject to United Kingdom sanctions